Zbigniew Gut (17 April 1949 – 27 March 2010) was a Polish football defender who played for the Poland national team in the 1974 FIFA World Cup and the 1972 Summer Olympics. The football club he was with for the longest part of his career was Odra Opole. His other clubs were Iskra Wymiarki, Promień Żary, Lech Poznań, and Red Star FC (1982–1984).

References

Notes 
Player profile on the Polish Olympic Committee website
 Andrzej Gowarzewski :  1996

1949 births
2010 deaths
People from Żagań County
Sportspeople from Lubusz Voivodeship
Association football defenders
1974 FIFA World Cup players
Footballers at the 1972 Summer Olympics
Promień Żary players
Lech Poznań players
Ligue 2 players
Odra Opole players
Olympic footballers of Poland
Olympic gold medalists for Poland
Paris FC players
Polish expatriate footballers
Polish expatriate sportspeople in France
Polish footballers
Poland international footballers
Red Star F.C. players
Stade Français (association football) players
Expatriate footballers in France
Olympic medalists in football
Medalists at the 1972 Summer Olympics